Jean Luret (born 6 August 1952) is a French director, producer and screenwriter.

Career 
At the end of the high school, to improve his English, Luret went to live in London.

In 1978, Luret created Cinémadis, a production company and film distribution. He began to create, at this time, feature films, including Baisers exotiques; Comme des bêtes, with Michel Galabru, Robert Castel, Katia Tchenko and Jacques Balutin; Exotic Kisses; and Like Animals (a feature film with the voice of animal Claude Piéplu).

In 1986, Luret penetrated the fashion world by conducting interviews with celebrities who are still shown on television.
Luret has a archive of over 2,000 hours of footage and interviews with celebrities of all kinds. These records are classified, scanned, indexed and made available to researchers.

In the beginning of the 1990s, Luret created for fashion houses hundreds of corporate videos on fashion shows. Hence, he obtained the recognition of this medium and the confidence of designers, which allows him even today to work with leading fashion houses.

In parallel with this activity, Luret produced and directed for French television documentary series, including:

 Paris Chic, anthologie de la mode –  35 episodes of 26 minutes each; broadcast on Planète+
 Arts de vivre – 12 episodes of 26 minutes each; broadcast on Odyssée
 Paris Glamour – 12 episodes of 26 minutes each; broadcast on NRJ 12

Documentaries of 52 minutes include:

 Black Beauty – broadcast on France Ô
 Katoucha, le destin tragique d'un top model – broadcast on France 3

With JLP Movies, Luret's activity consists in creating, for companies and private individuals, short and promotional films for websites.

Filmography

Director

Films 

 1975 - The Daughter of Emanuelle
 1982 – Les petites têtes
 1984 – C'est facile et ça peut rapporter... 20 ans
 1985 – Adam et Ève
 1988 – Comme des bêtes

Documentaries

Documentaries of 52 minutes 

 Folies Berrichonnes
 Comme des bêtes
 Folies Villageoises
 Fashion, Oh la la		
 Body-mania
 L'hiver de la Haute Couture
 Ah la Mode
 Noire Beauté
 La Mode des Grands Créateurs
 Les deux pieds dans le terroir
 Paris, Capitale de la Mode	
 Voyage en Haute Lingerie
 L’Homme parfait
 La Femme parfaite
 Katoucha, le destin tragique d’un top model
 L'extravagant destin de Geneviève de Fontenay
 L'intrigant destin d’un Transformiste, Michou
 Raymond Poulidor

References

External links
 

Place of birth missing (living people)
1952 births
20th-century French non-fiction writers
21st-century French non-fiction writers
French documentary film producers
Film directors from Paris
French documentary film directors
French film producers
French male screenwriters
French screenwriters
French television directors
French television producers
Living people
Writers from Paris
20th-century French male writers